

Background 

The University of Pretoria Faculty of Education, South Africa, took the initiative in 2013 to establish a platform for African deans of education. An informal structure under the leadership of Prof Irma Eloff (University of Pretoria Dean at the time) was established, with the University of Pretoria hosting the Secretariat of the Forum.
  
The ADEF was launched in July 2013 at the DETA 2013 Conference in Nairobi, Kenya.

Prof Irma Eloff stepped down as the lead facilitator of ADEF on 31 December 2018.

Prof Antonio Cipriano Goncalves, the Dean of Education at Eduardo Mondlane University in Mozambique (http://www.uem.mz/) is the lead facilitator of ADEF since 1 January 2019. He also represents ADEF on the KAIROS global forum for discussion, analysis, study and proposals on the future of education: https://kairos-educacion.com/

Purpose 

The purpose of the Forum is to facilitate dialogue on critical issues in teacher education among the leadership of African faculties of education.

Meetings 

The first meeting was held at the launch of the Forum during the DETA 2013 Conference, co-hosted by the University of Pretoria, South Africa, and the University of Nairobi, Kenya. The deans of the Faculty of Education of these two institutions, Prof Irma Eloff (University of Pretoria) and Prof Henry Mutoro (University of Nairobi) co-facilitated the Forum.  Deans from Anglophone, Francophone, Lusophone and Arabic Africa were present at the founding meeting.  Prof Bob Moon, professor of Education at the Open University (United Kingdom) and founding director of the Teacher Education in Sub-Saharan Africa (TESSA) Programme, served as distinguished guest at the founding meeting.  26 signatories accompanied the founding meeting.

The second meeting of ADEF was hosted by the Faculty of Education, University of Pretoria, South Africa in July 2014. Prof Irma Eloff hosted and facilitated the meeting.

The third meeting was held during the DETA 2015 Conference, July 2015, hosted by the Mauritius Institute of Education. The meeting was co-facilitated by Dr Oomandra Varma, Director of the Mauritius Institute of Education, and Prof Irma Eloff, Dean of the Faculty of Education, University of Pretoria.
 
At the meetings, participants mapped out critical issues for teacher education and development in Africa, shared their experiences and suggested an agenda for future communication and discussion amongst deans of Education in Africa.

In June 2016 ADEF met at the African Union in Addis Ababa, Ethiopia. Various deans presented innovative approaches in which teacher education was addressed within their respective contexts {http://www.deta.up.ac.za/}.  The growing role of technology in teacher education featured prominently during the presentations.  An Interim Steering Committee, representing the regional African deans, was constituted.

In August 2017 ADEF met at the University of Rwanda in Kigali.  The role of ADEF as a focal point of the UNESCO Teacher Task Force

(http://www.teachersforefa.unesco.org/v2/index.php/en/) was discussed.  Ideas for a cohesive project that would leverage the expertise and capacity of ADEF to support Sustainable Development Goal 4 (https://sustainabledevelopment.un.org/sdg4) was discussed.  The idea to create a doctoral network with a focus on teacher education in Africa received the full support of the meeting.  The Steering Committee was mandated to explore and develop the idea of a doctoral network in teacher education.

In February 2018 regional representatives from ADEF met at the Cradle of Humankind in South Africa to discuss the potential of a doctoral network in teacher education.  The Doctoral Network in Teacher Education in Africa (DNTEA) was conceptualized and the preliminary framework for DNTEA was designed.  The founding members of the DNTEA was Irma Eloff (South Africa), Antonio Cipriano Goncalves (Mozambique), Amani Ibrahim Abed Elgafar (Sudan), Therese Tchombe (Cameroon), Alois Chiromo (Zimbabwe) and Hyleen Mariaye (Mauritius).

The founding members of DNTEA were invited to present a symposium at the WERA World Congress (World Education Research) in Cape town in August 2018 (http://www.wera2018.co.za/).  Subsequently, the group was also invited to present the development of DNTEA at the 11th Policy Dialogue Forum of the International Task Force on Teachers for Education 2030 in Jamaica, November 2018 (http://www.teachersforefa.unesco.org/v2/index.php/en/).

UNESCO recognition 

At the third ADEF meeting, participants decided that the ADEF needed to establish a more formal structure to represent all the regions of Africa.
Since the meeting, Dr Edem Adubra (Head of the Secretariat, International Task Force on Teachers for Education for All (EFA, UNESCO) has informed Prof Eloff that the ADEF has been accepted as a recognised member of the UNESCO International Teachers Task Force (Education for All), and to serve as the voice of African deans on the platform. An interim steering committee has now been initiated with representatives from all the regions of Africa.

At the 8th Policy Dialogue Forum of the Teacher Task Force for Education ADEF presented views on teacher education from Africa.  The goal of this Policy Dialogue Forum, which took place in Mexico City in March 2016, was to share policies and practices in teacher education from around the globe.  ADEF was represented at the 9th Policy Dialogue Forum in Cambodia by prof Deena Boraie from Egypt and prof Antonio Cipriano Goncalves from Mozambique.  At the 10th Policy Dialogue Forum in Lome, Togo, ADEF was represented by Irma Eloff and the initial idea of a doctoral network for teacher education in Africa was shared during informal networking opportunities.  A formal presentation on DNTEA (Doctoral Network for Teacher Education in Africa) was made at the 11th Policy Dialogue Forum in Montego Bay, Jamaica in November 2018.

References

External links 
 Distance Education and Teacher Education 
 International Task Force on Teachers For Education

UNESCO
International development in Africa
Primary education
Education in Africa